Naval Base Brisbane was a major United States Navy base built in the early part of World War II at Brisbane, Queensland, Australia. At first, operated as a base for patrol aircraft and convoy escort aircraft to protect the last leg of the Pacific War to the Southwest Pacific. As the US Navy expanded in the island hopping campaign, Naval Base Brisbane expanded to include a submarine base, repair depot, seaplane base and other facilities. US Navy operations started on April 14, 1942, and ended after the war in 1945.

History
Australia entered World War II on September 3, 1939, being a self-governing nation within the British Empire. The United States formally entered the war on December 7, 1941, following the Japanese bombing of Pearl Harbor. On April 14, 1942, the USS Griffin (AS-13) and a fleet of eleven S-class US submarines arrived at Brisbane's New Farm Wharf. The wharf had a few storage sheds and some other support facilities, which the US Navy rented using the reverse Lend-Lease program, but a much larger facility was needed as a staging area. The US Government hired Australian construction crews to build a new staging area using mostly Australian supplies but with Quonset huts shipped in.

The S-class submarines' first mission was supporting the Solomon Islands campaign. Later, Gato-class submarines were added to the fleet. By the end of the war the Brisbane submarine fleet had sunk 117 enemy ships, totaling 515,000 tons, and rescued many downed airmen. In the spring of 1943, more space was needed and on March 24, 1943, the US Navy Seabee's 55th Battalion arrived and built "Camp Seabee",  5 miles north-east of Brisbane, at Eagle Farm. Camp Seabee became a staging camp for Seabees and their equipment in island hopping operations. The first departure was half the Seabees, to build Naval Base Milne Bay in New Guinea on May 23, 1943. Some Seabees departed to build an airfield at Merauke in New Guinea and others to Port Moresby, New Guinea. Most returned at the end of the construction for R&R. The Brisbane Seabees built a mine depot outside of Brisbane. The next departure was most of the Brisbane Seabees going to Palm Island and Cairns. At Palm Island, Seabees built Palm Island Naval Air Station and Palm Island Seaplane Base. Seabees built the Cairns Harbor PT-Boat Base and Cairns Harbor Seaplane Base. At Cairns, Seabees built the Cairns Airfield used for patrols and a staging camp. On June 19, 1943, the Seabee 84th Battalion arrived at Camp Seabee, with half the Battalion departing to continue the expansion at Naval Base Milne Bay. The 55th and 84th Battalion continued to build up Naval Base Brisbane. Seabee built a mine depot, more barracks at Camp Seabee, a Merchant Marine anti-aircraft training camp, and Mobile Navy Hospital No. 9. In May 1943, Seabee 60th Battalion arrived at Camp Seabee. On January 20, 1944, Seabee Construction Battalion Maintenance Unit 544th arrived to service the Naval Base Brisbane Bases.  At Hamilton, Queensland Seabee built a ship-repair depot was built. Outside of the base, a ammunition depot was built. The 55th Battalion built and operated a sawmill. By March 1994 the base had 90,000 square feet of depot warehouse space and 53 acres of open deposit storage. The other large US Naval Advance Bases in Australia were at Naval Base Sydney and Naval Base Darwin. Unlink Darwin, Brisbane was out of the reach of Japanese bombers. Parts of Naval Base Brisbane began moving to more forward bases in January 1944. Palm Island base was moved on September 1, 1944, and Townsville moved in July 1944.

Bases and facilities
Brisbane, Queensland Bases:
United States Seventh Fleet:

Naval Base Brisbane
Naval Base Brisbane on the Brisbane River
Navy Headquarters, from Naval Base Melbourne in July 1942.
New Farm Wharf depot, now New Farm Park ferry wharf
AHS Centaur, USS Samaritan (AH-10) and USS Comfort (AH-6) Hospital ships
Brisbane Submarine base
Some Submarines Base at Brisbane:, Caiman, Pompon, Cod, Raton, Guavina, Bowfin, Grouper, Grouper, Blackfish, Rasher, Balao, Corvina
Submarine maintenance depot
Submarine training center
Brisbane Degaussing Station 
Crash boat base
Fleet Post Office FPO# 134 SF Brisbane
Barracks 
Supply depot
Ammunition depot, Brisbane Navy 134 at Mount Coot-tha
Mine depot outside of the city
Mobile Explosives Investigation Unit. No.1 
Archerfield shared with Army, just south of Brisbane.
Camp Perry Park, Navy housing unit at Camp Perry Park 
Toowoomba Recreation Center, at Toowoomba west of Brisbane
Coolangatta Recreation Center at Coolangatta, south of Brisbane 
Transmitting Station at Colmslie

Naval Air Station Brisbane
Naval Air Station Brisbane was based in Colmslie on the Brisbane River.
Naval Base Colmslie 
NATS Seaplane Base Colmslie  (now Colmslie Recreational Park)
Colmslie Seaplane workshop, repair of Navy Consolidated PBY Catalina planes
Navy and Pan Am radio station, Pan Am used the base for mail and other services.
Imperial Airways, BOAC, RAAF and Qantas also use the base.
Post war became Barrier Reef Airways base

Hamilton repair depot
Repair depot
Hamilton repair depot in Hamilton on the Brisbane River.
Cairncross Dockyard  
Supply depot
Machine shops
Engineering camp
Chemical Engineering Camp
Some repair ship at Brisbane:
USS Howard W. Gilmore (AS-16)
USS Remus (ARL-40)
USS Clytie
USS Fulton (AS-11)
USS Sperry (AS-12)
USS Wachapreague (AGP-8)
USS Satinleaf (AN-43)
USS Sonoma (AT-12)
USS Geronimo (ATA-207)
USS Wright (AV-1)
USS Coucal (ASR-8)
USS Mataco (AT-86)
USS Portunus (AGP-4)
USS Oyster Bay (AGP-6)
SS Stratheden
USS Tangier (AV-8)
USS Dobbin (AD-3)

Camp Seabee

Camp Seabee at Eagle Farm on the Brisbane River in Brisbane
Camp Seabee
Camp Seabee staging camp and depot
Merchant Marine Anti-aircraft training camp, Wellington Point Gunnery School at Wellington Point
Advanced Base Construction Depot (ABCD)
Mobile Navy Hospital No. 9, with 3,000 beds 
Theater
Recreation building
Laundry depot
Power station 
Decomposed granite quarry for roads.
Eagle Farm Airfield, shared with Army
Allison Engine Testing Area

Camp Seabee was home to the:
19th Construction Battalion Special 
20th Construction Battalion
55th Construction Battalion 
60th Construction Battalion 
77th Construction Battalion
84th Construction Battalion
91st Construction Battalion 
Amphibious Construction Battalion 1 - 104th Naval Construction Battalion 
115th Construction Battalion
138th Naval Construction Battalion
Naval Mobile Construction Battalion 11

From the staging at Camp Seabee, Construction Battalions departed to help build:
Naval Base Cairns
Naval Air Station Palm Island
Townsville Naval Section Base
Thursday Island PT Boat Base
Naval Base Sydney
Naval Base Merauke
KanaKopa PT Boat Base
Oro Bay Airfield
Naval Base Lae - Landing at Lae
Naval Base Mios Woendi at Mios Woendi PT Boat Base and Owi Airfield
Naval Base Woodlark Island
Naval Base Milne Bay
Naval Base Finschhafen
Naval Base Hollandia
Kiriwina Airfield
Naval Base Cape Gloucester - Battle of Cape Gloucester
Naval Base Alexishafen, at Madang
Naval Base Morotai - Battle of Morotai
Naval Base Banika Island on Banika:
Renard Field and Banika Field 
Renard Sound Seaplane Base
Naval Base Saipan
Naval Base Okinawa
Naval Base Amsterdam Island on Amsterdam Island, West Papua, PT Boat Base
Leyte-Samar Naval Base  60th CB
Naval Base Guadalcanal - Guadalcanal campaign 61th CB
Tenaru Camp - Battle of the Tenaru
Koli Point Camp - Koli Point action
Naval Base Lunga at Lunga Point
Henderson Field 6th CB
Naval Base Manicani Repair base
Radar Station at Auki for RNZA 60th CB
Naval Base Emirau 60th CB on Emirau Island
Naval Base Darwin 84th CB
Naval Base Puerto Princesa at Palawan  84th CB 
Naval Base Manus
Naval Base Treasury Islands
Torokina Airfield
Piva Airfield
Naval Base Lingayen - Sual Bay PT Boat Base 104th CB
Naval Base Subic Bay
Olongapo Naval Station Olongapo Camp, 115th CB
NAS Attu 138th CB on Attu Island
Naval Base Auckland at Auckland
Bases in the Aleutian Islands 138th CB

Other camps

Camp La Fayette Prison Stockade at Eagle Farm
Camp Whinstanes, Prison

Remote Advanced Bases

Naval Base Brisbane built and supported remote advanced bases in Queensland:

Naval Base Cairns
Naval Base Cairns at Cairns, north of Brisbane, closed January 7, 1945 (now HMAS Cairns Part of the base was on Green Island, 20 miles of the shore.
Cairns Harbor PT-Boat Base, later moved to Milne Bay  
Cairns Harbor Seaplane Base 
PT Boat repair base
Escort Base One destroyer repair depot
Naval mine maintenance depot
Patrol-craft repair depot 
Supply depot
Mess hall
Navy hospital 
Feet post office FPO# 144 SF Cairns, Australia
Floating drydocks: AFD-10, ARD-7
600-foot timber wharf
5,000-gallon water tank farm
Ammunition depot outside of camp
Cairns Airfield used for patrols 
Cairns staging camp 
Trinity Bay, amphibious training, US Army, Navy with US Navy support.
Sheridan Street Camp, Cairns Army Camp located along Sheridan, Dutton and Spence Street.

Naval Air Station Palm Island
Naval Air Station Palm Island, at Palm Island north of Brisbane, started July 6, 1943, closed June 1, 1944.
VPB-29 Patrol Bomber unit
VP-11 Patrol Squadron with Consolidated PBY Catalina
Hangars
Seaplane Base Palm Island
Fleet Post Office FPO# 420 SF Palm Island, Australia
Naval Air Station Wallaby Point 
60,000 barrels tank farm
Palm Island patrol bombers repair depot
Docks
Radio stations
PT boat bases
Hospitals
Naval mine depot
Power station
Supply base

Townsville Naval Section Base
Townsville Naval Section Base
North of Brisbane a section base was built a Townsville closed and moved July 1944.
Rose Bay Townsville Navy hospital, 120-bed 
Ammunition depot outside of camp
Fleet Post Office FPO# 143 SF Townsville, Australia
Townsville Navy hospital, 100-bed
Black River Navy hospital 
US Navy at Cleveland Bay 
 Army camp, staging
Army airfields and Army 12th Station Hospital
HMAS Magnetic  Royal Australian Navy base near US base

Horn Island Seaplane Base
Horn Island Seaplane Base at small Horn Island, far north of Brisbane
Horn Island Airport RAAF

Thursday Island PT Boat Base
Thursday Island PT Boat Base was built on Thursday Island, far north of Brisbane, by the Seabees. The base opened in February 1943 and closed in September 1945. Thursday Island PT Boat Base had a PT Boat repair depot. The base was shared, HMAS Carpentaria base. The US also stationed some submarine bases at the base.

Toorbul Combined Training Centre
Toorbul Combined Training Centre (CTC) was a joint Army and Navy amphibious training center opened on the summer of 1942 at Toorbul on Toorbul Point, now called Sandstone Point. The center had classrooms, camp, mess hall, jetties, slipway, a mock ship, and workshops. Royal Australian Air Force also had Radar Station at the base.
Fleet PO Box was 146.

Other bases
Fleet Radio Unit Radio Station Cooktown at Cooktown, Queensland. FPO# 813 SF Cooktown
For Prisoner of war 16 camps were built in Queensland by Australians and US.
Mareeba Airfield (Hoevet Field) US Army
Torrens Creek Airfield in Torrens Creek, US Army, now Torrens Creek Airport
Mackay Airfield and Mackay recreation facilities at Mackay, Queensland

Post war
After Victory over Japan Day the base closed and the US Navy started taking Troops home in Operation Magic Carpet.
A number of Memorials were built in memory of the World War II activities in Australia:
Catalina Memorial Cairns Esplanade, at Cairns Esplanade near Cairns Harbor. Three white pillars with a model of a Consolidated Catalina atop and a memorial plaque to the crew of Catalina A24-25, at 
Cairns War Cemetery, administered by the Commonwealth War Graves Commission (CWGC) at  
Cairns Museum
Beck Museum in Mareeba, closed 
Milne Bay Military Museum in Toowoomba
Townsville War Cemetery at  
Memorial at Bakers Creek in Bakers Creek.

Gallery

See also
Naval Base Melbourne
Naval Base Adelaide
Battle of Brisbane
Axis naval activity in Australian waters
US Naval Advance Bases
List of Royal Australian Navy bases

External links
youtube, Abandoned Navy Base on The Brisbane River
youtube, World War 2 - Defence of Australia

References

Naval Stations of the United States Navy
World War II airfields in the Pacific Ocean Theater
Airfields of the United States Navy
Military installations closed in the 1940s
Closed installations of the United States Navy
World War II sites in Australia